George Curtis Locke Wallach (20 March 1883 – 2 April 1980) was a Scottish long-distance runner. He competed in the 10,000 m at the 1912 Summer Olympics, but failed to reach the final.

Wallach was born in Scotland to Hermann Louis Waldemar Wallach, a German tinsmith, and Janet Wallach, a native Scot. In 1905 he moved to Lewes and in 1906 to Lancashire to work for the Manchester Evening News. While living in England he competed at Scotland Championships and won the 4 miles in 1911 and 1913, and the 10 miles in 1913–14, breaking the Scottish records. Wallach also won the Scottish cross-country championships in 1914 and 1922, and in 1910–1924 represented Scotland at the International Cross Country Championships, winning two individual and six team medals.

References

1883 births
1980 deaths
Scottish male long-distance runners
Olympic athletes of Great Britain
Athletes (track and field) at the 1912 Summer Olympics